The Men's 4 × 100 metre freestyle relay competition at the 2022 World Aquatics Championships was held on 18 June 2022.

Records
Prior to the competition, the existing world and championship records were as follows.

Results

Heats
The heats were started at 11:29.

Final
The final was held at 19:36.

References

Men's 4 x 100 metre freestyle relay